Kalateh-ye Molla (also Romanized as Kalāteh-ye Mollā and Kalāteh-i-Mulla; also known as Mollā) is a village in Qohestan Rural District, Qohestan District, Darmian County, South Khorasan Province, Iran. At the 2006 census, its population was 239, in 69 families.

References 

Populated places in Darmian County